The 1976 New Zealand rugby union tour of South America was a series of eight matches played by the New Zealand national rugby union team in Uruguay and Argentina in October and November 1976. The tour was entirely successful as the New Zealand team won all nine matches, scoring a total of 321 points with 72 conceded.

New Zealand did not award full international caps for the three international matches against the Uruguay and Argentina national teams. The match played on 29 October was also first time Argentina played New Zealand in their history.

Matches

Summary 
 Test matches

Notes

Match details 
Complete list of matches played by New Zealand in Uruguay and Argentina:

Buenos Aires: S. Gutiérrez O'Farrell; R. Benyon, I. Balfour, 1. Gutierrez O'Farrell, E.Sansot; J. Igarzábal, R. Landajo (capt.); R. Casabal, R. Lucke, M. García Haymes; J. Rodríguez jurado, E, Greene; R. Ventura, E. Vila, A. Cerioni. New Zealand: G. Rowlands; S. Wilson, E. Stokes, M. Taylor, K. Granger; M. Taylor, I. Stevens; G. Mourie (capt.), S. Conn, M. Jaffray; J. Calleson, A. Haden; J. Me Eldowney, J. Black, P. Sapsford. 

Interior: R. Muñiz; J. Nogués, O. Terranova R. L'Erario, G. Morgan; D. Guarrochena (Escalante) C. Baetti; B. Minguez, J. Nazzasi (capt.), J. Navesi; R. Pessaglia, J. Mangiamelli; A. Sofredini, J. Crivelli, C. Abud. 
New Zealand: R. Wilson; S. Cartwright, S. Wilson, D. Rollerson, K. Granger; J. Brake, I. Stevens; G. Mourie (capt.), S. Conn, P. Ryan; A. Haden, V. Stewart; J. Spiers, P. Sloane, J. Me Eldowney. 

 C.A. San Isidro: M. Alonso; D. Beccar Varela, A. Travaglini, G. Beccar Varela, R. Rinaldi; J.Igarzábal, A. Etchegaray (capt.); R. Brinnand, M. García Haymes, A. Urien; L. Varela, G. Allen (A.Casanova); M. Farina, G. Casas, L. Moore. 
New Zealand: G. Rowlands; S. Cartwright, S. Wilson, D. Rollerson, Mark Taylor; Murray Taylor, K.Greene; P. Ryan, G. Mourie (capt.), S. Cron; A. Haden, J. Calleson; P. Sapsford, P. Sloane, J. McEldowney. 

 Tucumán: J. Monterrubio; M. Rodríguez, L. Gamboa, C. Imbert, G. Solá; P.Acuña, G. Palou; J. Bach (capt.), J. Posse, F. Veglia; C. Figueroa, J. Yapur; H. Pérez, S. Martoni, C. Bonano. – Replacements: M. Galindo y L. de Chazal 
New Zealand: R. Wilson; S. Cartwright, E. Stokes, D. Rollerson, K. Granger; J. Brake, I. Stevens; S. Conn, M. Jaffray, S. Cron; V. Stewart, A. Haden; J. Spiers, J. Black, P. Sapsford 

Rosario RU: Baetti; Romero Acuna, Giner (C. Blanco), Gorina, G. Blanco; Escalante, Castagna; Cúneo, Imhoff (R. Pecce), Macat; Senatore (capt.), Mangiamelli; Pavani, Seaton, Risler.  New Zealand: R. Wilson; K. Granger, Mark Taylor, E. Stokes, S. Wilson; J. Brake, K. Greene; G.Mourie (capt.), S. Conn, P. Ryan; A. Haden, V. Stewart; P. Sapsford, J. Black, J. Spiers. 

Cuyo: Muñiz; Massera (Stahrínger), O. Terranova (E. Terranova), Tarquini, Morgan; Guarrochena, Chacón; Navessi, (capitán), Nassazzi, Antonini (Viazzo); Serpa Cattaneo; Irañeta, Crivelli, Michelli. New Zealand: R. Wilson; S. Cartwright, E. Stokes, D. Rollerson, K. Granger; K. Greene, J. Brake S.Cron, G Mourie (capitán), P. Ryan; A. Haden, V. Stewart; J. Spiers, J. Black, J. Mc Elowney.

Bibliography

References 

New Zealand national rugby union team tours
1976
New Zealand rugby union tour of Argentina
1976 in New Zealand rugby union
rugby

it:Tour della Nazionale di rugby a 15 della Nuova Zelanda 1976